Rosanne Cash (born May 24, 1955) is an American singer-songwriter and author. She is the eldest daughter of country musician Johnny Cash and Vivian Liberto Cash Distin, Johnny Cash's first wife. Although she is often classified as a country artist, her music draws on many genres, including folk, pop, rock, blues, and most notably Americana. In the 1980s, she had a string of genre-crossing singles that entered both the country and pop charts, the most commercially successful being her 1981 breakthrough hit "Seven Year Ache", which topped the U.S. country singles chart and reached the Top 30 on the U.S. pop chart.

In 1990, Cash released Interiors, a spare, introspective album which signaled a break from her pop country past. The following year she ended her marriage and moved from Nashville to New York City where she continues to write, record, and perform, having since released six albums, written three books, and edited a collection of short stories. Her fiction and essays have been published in The New York Times, Rolling Stone, The Oxford American, New York Magazine, and other periodicals and collections.

Cash won a Grammy Award in 1985 for "I Don't Know Why You Don't Want Me" and has received 12 other Grammy nominations. She has had 11 No. 1 country hit singles, 21 Top 40 country singles, and two gold records. Cash was the 2014 recipient of Smithsonian magazine's American Ingenuity Award in the Performing Arts category. On February 8, 2015, Cash won three Grammy awards for Best Americana Album for The River & the Thread, Best American Roots Song with John Leventhal and Best American Roots Performance for A Feather's Not A Bird. Cash was honored further in October that year, when she was inducted into the Nashville Songwriters Hall of Fame.

Early life
Cash was born in 1955 in Memphis, Tennessee, to Vivian and Johnny Cash, when Johnny was recording his first tracks at Sun Records.  Cash's mother was Vivian Cash (née Liberto), a half Irish, African American and German, and half Sicilian whose Italian grandparents were from Cefalù, Palermo. Genealogists from the show Finding Your Roots discovered that one of Rosanne's maternal great-great-great-grandmothers, Sarah A. Shields, was a mixed-race woman born into slavery, who was freed along with her eight siblings by their white father. It was also revealed that Cash and actress Angela Bassett are distant relatives through shared DNA from a common African American ancestor.

The family moved to California in 1958, first to Los Angeles, then Ventura, where Cash and her sisters were raised by their mother. (Vivian and Johnny separated in the early 1960s and divorced in 1966.) After graduating from St. Bonaventure High School, she joined her father's road show for two and a half years, first as a wardrobe assistant, then as a background vocalist and occasional soloist.  She made her studio recording debut on Johnny Cash's 1974 album The Junkie and the Juicehead Minus Me, singing lead vocal on a version of Kris Kristofferson's "Broken Freedom Song".

In 1976, Johnny Cash recorded the Rosanne Cash composition "Love Has Lost Again" on his album One Piece At A Time.  Though she did not appear on this track, it was Rosanne Cash's first professionally recorded work as a composer.  That same year, she briefly worked for CBS Records in London before returning to Nashville to study English and drama at Vanderbilt University. She then relocated to Los Angeles to study at the Lee Strasberg Theatre Institute in Hollywood. She recorded a demo in January 1978 with Emmylou Harris' songwriter/sideman Rodney Crowell, which led to a full album with German label Ariola Records.

Music career

1978–1980: First American release
Her self-titled debut album was recorded in 1978, but Ariola never released it in the United States, and it has since become a collector's item. Mainly recorded and produced in Munich, Germany, with German-based musicians, it also included three tracks recorded in Nashville and produced by Crowell. Though Cash was unhappy with the album, it attracted the attention of Columbia Records, which offered her a recording contract. She began playing with Crowell's band The Cherry Bombs in California clubs. Crowell and Cash married in 1979, and Cash started work on her first Columbia LP.

The album, Right or Wrong, was released in early 1980, and produced three Top 25 singles. The first, "No Memories Hangin' Around", a duet with country singer Bobby Bare, reached 17 on the Country Singles chart in 1979. It was followed by "Couldn't Do Nothing Right" and "Take Me, Take Me" in 1980. Cash, pregnant with her first child, was unable to tour in support of the album, which was nevertheless a critical success. Cash and Crowell moved to Nashville in 1981.

1981–1989: Critical and commercial success

Cash's career picked up considerable momentum with the release of her second album, Seven Year Ache, in 1981. The album achieved critical raves and solid sales, and the title track was a No. 1 hit on the Billboard Country Chart and crossed over to the Billboard Pop Chart, peaking at No. 22. The album yielded two additional No. 1 country hits, "My Baby Thinks He's a Train" and "Blue Moon with Heartache", and was certified Gold by the RIAA.

Cash's third album, Somewhere in the Stars (1982), was considered a disappointment after the commercial success of Seven Year Ache. The album still reached the Top 100 of the U.S. pop album charts and included three U.S. country chart singles, "Ain't No Money", "I Wonder", and "It Hasn't Happened Yet". Cash struggled with substance abuse during this time, and in 1984 she sought medical treatment.

After a three-year hiatus, Cash released her fourth studio album, Rhythm & Romance (1985), which yielded two No. 1 hits, "I Don't Know Why You Don't Want Me" and "Never Be You", and two other Country Top 10 singles, "Hold On" and "Second to No One". Rhythm & Romance drew high critical praise for its fusion of country and pop. "I Don't Know Why You Don't Want Me" won the 1985 Grammy award for Best Female Country Vocal Performance; "Hold On" won the 1987 Robert J. Burton Award from BMI as the Most Performed Song of the Year.

In the '80s, Cash curtailed her touring for childbearing and raising a family (three daughters with Crowell, as well as Hannah, Crowell's daughter by his first marriage). She continued to record and in 1987 released the most critically acclaimed album of her career, King's Record Shop. It spawned four No. 1 hits, including a cover version of her father's "Tennessee Flat Top Box", John Hiatt's "The Way We Make a Broken Heart", "If You Change Your Mind", John Stewart's "Runaway Train", and became Cash's second gold album. In 1988 Cash recorded a duet with Crowell, "It's Such a Small World" (released on his Diamonds & Dirt album), which also went to No. 1 on the country charts, and Cash was named Billboard's Top Singles Artist of the year.

In 1989, Columbia released her first compilation album, Hits 1979–1989. The album yielded two new hit singles, the Beatles cover "I Don't Want to Spoil the Party", which landed at No. 1 on the Billboard country charts, and "Black and White", which earned Cash her fifth Grammy nomination.

1990–1995: Break up and relocation

In 1990, Cash released the critically acclaimed, deeply personal Interiors. Cash produced herself for the first time and wrote or co-wrote all the songs. "Her brutally dark take on intimate relationships was reflected throughout and made clear the marital problems that had been hinted at on earlier albums." "Highly autobiographical (though Cash has often insisted it isn't quite as true to life as everyone assumes), Interiors was a brilliant, introspective album" and "her masterpiece". Other critics called it "maudlin" and "pessimistic". Interiors topped many best album lists in 1990 and received a Grammy award nomination for Best Contemporary Folk Album. It yielded one Top 40 single ("What We Really Want") and marked the beginning of sharp commercial decline for Cash.

Though it may have been inspired by the breakup of her marriage, it also signified her departure from Nashville and its country music establishment. In 1991 Cash relocated to New York City; in 1992, she and Crowell divorced. The Wheel, released in 1993, was "an unflinchingly confessional examination of the marriage's failure that ranked as her most musically diverse effort to date". The album was Cash's last for Columbia Records. It received considerable acclaim from critics, though neither of its two singles, "The Wheel" or "You Won't Let Me In", charted.

1995–present: New York, new albums and books

Cash settled in lower Manhattan and in 1995 married producer/songwriter/guitarist John Leventhal, with whom she had co-produced The Wheel. She signed with Capitol Records and in 1996 released 10 Song Demo, a collection of stark home recordings with minimal accompaniment. She also pursued a career as a writer and in 1996 Hyperion published the short story collection Bodies of Water to favorable reviews. In 1997, Cash was awarded an honorary doctorate from Memphis College of Art. She gave the commencement address that year and continues to speak publicly on writing and music.

In 1998, she and Leventhal began working on what would later become Rules of Travel. The recording sessions were cut short when she became pregnant and was unable to sing for two and a half years, due to a polyp on her vocal cords.

Unable to record, Cash focused on her writing. Her children's book Penelope Jane: A Fairy's Tale, which included an exclusive CD, was published by HarperCollins in 2000, and in 2001 she edited a collection of short fiction by songwriters titled Songs Without Rhyme: Prose by Celebrated Songwriters. Recovering her voice, she resumed recording and in 2003 released Rules of Travel, her first full-fledged studio album for Capitol. The album had guest appearances by Sheryl Crow and Steve Earle, a song co-written by Joe Henry and Jakob Dylan, and the poignant "September When It Comes," a duet with her father. Rules of Travel was nominated for a 2003 Grammy Award for Best Contemporary Folk Album.

Cash was also an inaugural member of the Independent Music Awards' judging panel to support independent artists.

In 2005, Legacy Recordings reissued Seven Year Ache (1981), King's Record Shop (1987), and Interiors (1990), plus a new collection spanning 1979–2003, The Very Best of Rosanne Cash.

In 2006, Cash released Black Cadillac, an album marked by the loss of stepmother June, and father Johnny, who both died in 2003, as well as mother Vivian, Johnny's first wife, who died as Rosanne finished the album in 2005. The album was critically praised, and named to the Top 10 lists of The New York Times, Billboard, PopMatters, NPR and other general interest and music publications. The album was nominated for a 2006 Grammy Award for Best Contemporary Folk/Americana Album.

Cash toured extensively in support of the album, and created a multimedia performance, with video, imagery and narration drawn from the songs and from Cash's family history. In 2006, a short documentary by filmmaker Steve Lippman, "Mariners and Musicians", based on the album and interviews with Cash, premiered at the Tribeca Film Festival and was screened at festivals worldwide. Cash's music was also featured prominently in an American Masters biography of photographer Annie Leibovitz, who has photographed Cash and her family numerous times.

In late 2007, Cash underwent brain surgery for a rare condition (Chiari I malformation) and was forced to cancel her remaining concert dates. After a successful recovery, she resumed writing and live appearances. In 2008 she wrote for Measure for Measure, the songwriters' column in The New York Times, recorded with Kris Kristofferson and Elvis Costello, and appeared on Costello's TV series Spectacle.

Cash released her next studio album, entitled The List, on October 6, 2009. The album is based on a list of 100 greatest country and American songs that Johnny Cash gave her when she was 18. Cash picked 12 songs out of the 100 for the album. The album features vocal duets with Bruce Springsteen, Elvis Costello, Jeff Tweedy, and Rufus Wainwright. An iTunes Store-only 13th song features a duet with Neko Case. On September 9, 2010, the Americana Music Association named The List the Album of the Year.

In addition to her own recordings, Cash has made guest appearances on albums by Jeff Bridges, Rodney Crowell, Guy Clark, Vince Gill, Lyle Lovett, Mary Chapin Carpenter, Marc Cohn, The Chieftains, John Stewart, Willy Mason, Mike Doughty, Black 47 and others, as well as children's albums by Larry Kirwan, Tom Chapin, and Dan Zanes and Friends. She has also appeared on tribute albums to The Band, Johnny Cash, Bob Dylan, Woody Guthrie, Jimi Hendrix, John Hiatt, Kris Kristofferson, Laura Nyro, Yoko Ono, Doc Pomus, and Tammy Wynette.

Cash wrote New York Times Bestseller Composed: A Memoir in 2010 "a pointillistic memoir about growing up with and without her father, and about how she slid out from under his shadow to become a gifted artist in her own right."

In November 2011, Cash performed with the Minnesota Orchestra. In preparation for the event, she worked with composer Stephen Barber to orchestrate nine of her songs.

The tourism organization Brand USA enlisted Cash to develop a song to promote foreign tourism to the United States. In April 2012, she released the song "Land of Dreams", which was utilized by Brand USA in video advertisements and online as part of a global tourism campaign.

On February 6, 2012, Cash received the AFTRA Media and Entertainment Excellence Award in Sound Recordings.

Cash sang the part of Monique on the 2013 album Ghost Brothers of Darkland County, a collaboration between rock singer John Mellencamp and novelist Stephen King.

Cash gave the closing speech at the Association of Performing Arts Presenters' conference, APAP|NYC, in January 2013.

Cash signed with Blue Note Records in 2013 to release a new original album. The River & the Thread was released on January 14, 2014. It was Cash's first album in more than four years.

The River & the Thread is a collection of songs written with husband and collaborator John Leventhal, inspired by trips through the American South. Cash describes The River & The Thread as "a mini-travelogue of the South, and of the soul." The Journey included visits to father Johnny Cash's childhood home in Dyess, Arkansas; her own early childhood home in Memphis, TN; William Faulkner's house; Dockery Plantation in Cleveland, MS, the plantation where Howlin' Wolf and Charley Patton worked and sang; Natchez, MS; the blues trail; the Tallahatchie Bridge; as well as a visit with Natalie Chanin, a master seamstress in Florence, Alabama.

Throughout 2014, Cash toured extensively with partner John Leventhal, performing The River & The Thread in sequence with first-person stories woven through historical time to much critical acclaim. The River & The Thread was the Number One album of 2014 on Americana radio, and was honored by USA Today, The New York Times, The Village Voice, Rolling Stone, The Huffington Post, NPR Fresh Air, Uncut (magazine), No Depression, The Sun (UK), and American Songwriter as one of the top albums of 2014.

On February 8, 2015, Cash won three Grammy awards for Best Americana Album for The River & The Thread, and Best American Roots Song with John Leventhal and Best American Roots Performance for "A Feather's Not A Bird".

In 2015, Cash was inducted into the Nashville Songwriters Hall of Fame, honored as Artist-in-Residence at the Country Music Hall of Fame and Museum, and selected as Carnegie Hall's 2015-2016 Perspective Series Artist.

In 2018, Cash signed with ICM Partners and released a new album entitled "She Remembers Everything."

On February 29, 2020, Cash, with her band, performed at the historic Universal Preservation Hall in Saratoga Springs, New York, to inaugurate its re-opening as a state-of-the-art performing arts venue.

Personal life

Family

Cash has three younger sisters: Kathy, Cindy, and Tara. Her parents divorced in 1966; her father married June Carter in 1968. Cash's stepsisters are country singers 

 Carlene Carter (from June's marriage to singer Carl Smith) and 
 the late Rosie Nix Adams, aka Rosie Carter (from June's marriage to Edwin "Rip" Nix). 

Johnny and June's son, John Carter Cash, is Rosanne's half-brother. Cash's stepmother and father died in 2003, and her mother in 2005.

Cash married country music singer-songwriter Rodney Crowell in 1979. They have three daughters: Caitlin, Chelsea, and Carrie. Cash also raised Crowell's daughter, Hannah, from a previous marriage. Cash and Crowell divorced in 1992. She married her second husband, John Leventhal, in 1995, and they have one son, Jakob. Cash lives with her husband and son in Chelsea, Manhattan.

Health
On November 27, 2007, Cash was admitted to New York's Presbyterian Hospital for brain surgery. In a press statement, she announced that she suffered from Chiari malformation type I and expected to "make a full recovery". The surgery was successful, though recovery was slow, and in March 2008 she was forced to cancel her spring tour dates for further recuperation. She wrote about the experience in her The New York Times article "Well, Actually, It Is Brain Surgery". She resumed writing, recording and performing in late summer of 2008.

Other projects
Cash supports several charitable organizations. She is a longtime board member of The Center To Prevent Youth Violence (CPYV), formally known as PAX, an organization dedicated to preventing gun violence among children. She was honored by PAX at their fifth annual benefit gala in 2005.

Cash is a frequent guest teacher at the English and Songwriting programs of various colleges and universities including LeMoyne, Fairleigh-Dickinson and NYU.

Cash has been associated with Children, Incorporated for more than 25 years and has sponsored many children through the organization, which works to support and educate needy children and young adults worldwide.

Cash was elected to the Century Association in 2009

She also works with Arkansas State University on the Johnny Cash Boyhood Home project, which has restored her father's childhood home in Dyess, Arkansas. The Cash family has supported the restoration by raising money through annual music festivals. Rosanne hosted the first and second annual Johnny Cash Music Festivals in 2011 and 2012. She resumed rotating host duties with her half-brother John Carter when the festival resumed at Dyess in 2017.

In 2014 Cash contributed essays to the Oxford-American and the book of collected essays edited by Sari Botton Never Can Say Goodbye: Writers On Their Unshakable Love For New York. She was also featured in Gael Towey's Portraits in Creativity as a featured artist for her Profile Series.

Cash is a dedicated supporter of artists' rights in the digital age and sits on the board of the Content Creators Coalition. On June 25, 2014, Cash testified before The House of Representatives, Judiciary Committee on intellectual property rights and Internet music licensing.

In 2018, Cash was a recipient of an honorary doctorate degree from Berklee College of Music.

Discography

Studio albums
 1978: Rosanne Cash
 1980: Right or Wrong
 1981: Seven Year Ache
 1982: Somewhere in the Stars
 1985: Rhythm & Romance
 1987: King's Record Shop
 1990: Interiors
 1993: The Wheel
 1996: 10 Song Demo
 2003: Rules of Travel
 2006: Black Cadillac
 2009: The List
 2014: The River & the Thread
 2018: She Remembers Everything

Books and articles

Cash's work has also appeared in The New York Times, The Oxford American, New York Magazine, Newsweek, Rolling Stone, and Martha Stewart Living.

Awards and honors
Academy of Country Music Awards

Americana Music Honors & Awards

Country Music Association Awards 

Grammy Awards 
To date, Cash has been nominated for 15 Grammy Awards across four genre categories: Country, Folk, Pop and American Roots.

Other honors

In 2021, Cash was awarded The Edward MacDowell Medal by The MacDowell Colony for outstanding contributions to American culture.

On May 7, 2022, Cash was awarded an honorary doctorate degree in Humane Letters by Arkansas State University. She was the keynote speaker during commencement.

References

External links
 

NPR Music: Rosanne Cash artist page

1955 births
20th-century American guitarists
American country singer-songwriters
American women country singers
American people of English descent
American people of Scottish descent
Ariola Records artists
Blue Note Records artists
Capitol Records artists
Cash–Carter family
Columbia Records artists
Grammy Award winners
Country musicians from Tennessee
Lee Strasberg Theatre and Film Institute alumni
Living people
Manhattan Records artists
Musicians from Memphis, Tennessee
Guitarists from Tennessee
Vanderbilt University alumni
People from Chelsea, Manhattan
20th-century American women guitarists
Singer-songwriters from Tennessee
Singer-songwriters from New York (state)
21st-century American women guitarists